The Wheaton Thunder football program is a college football team that represents Wheaton College in the College Conference of Illinois and Wisconsin, a part of the Division III (NCAA).  The team has had 22 head coaches since its first recorded football game in 1900. The current coach is Mike Swider who first took the position for the 1996 season.

Key

Coaches
Statistics correct as of the end of the 2022 college football season, except the conference win/loss/tie statistics are incomplete.

Notes

References

Wheaton Thunder

Wheaton Thunder head football coaches